Cañas Dulces is a district of the Liberia canton, in the Guanacaste province of Costa Rica.

The administrative center of Cañas Dulces District is the village of Cañas Dulces. The district has a population of about 3500 people.  Cañas Dulces is near Rincón de la Vieja Volcano National Park and the Rincón de la Vieja Volcano.

Wildlife
Wildlife in Cañas Dulces includes monkeys such as the mantled howler, as well as the white-headed capuchin and Geoffroy's spider monkey, and birds such as the keel-billed toucan.

Geography 
Cañas Dulces has an area of  km² and an elevation of  metres.

Demographics 

For the 2011 census, Cañas Dulces had a population of  inhabitants.

Transportation

Road transportation 
The district is covered by the following road routes:
 National Route 1

References 

Districts of Guanacaste Province
Populated places in Guanacaste Province